Dobbin can refer to:

 Horse, as rural slang

Dobbin may refer to the following people:
Brian Dobbin (born 1966), a retired Canadian professional ice hockey player
Craig Dobbin (1935–2006), Canadian businessman
Dermot Dobbin, Canadian businessman
Uncle Dobbin (1879–1950), nickname of Frederick Dobbin, South African rugby union international
James C. Dobbin (1814–1857), the United States Secretary of the Navy from 1853 to 1857
Jim Dobbin (1941–2014), British politician
Jim Dobbin (footballer) (born 1964), a Scottish former professional football player 
Kate Dobbin (1868–c.1948), an Irish artist
Leonard Dobbin (1775–1844), Irish Liberal politician
Mary Alice Dwyer-Dobbin, American television producer
Tony Dobbin (born 1972), a retired Irish National Hunt jockey 
William Dobbin, character in William Makepeace Thackerays novel Vanity Fair

Dobbin may also refer to the following places:
Dobbin, Texas
Dobbin, West Virginia
Dobbins, California, formerly Dobbin

Other uses:
USS Dobbin (AD-3), an American Navy destroyer tender launched 5 May 1921 and decommissioned on 27 September 1946
USRC James C. Dobbin (1853)
 A pantomime horse on the British television series Rentaghost

See also
Dobbins (disambiguation)